KMCA-LD (channel 10) is a low-power television station in Redding, California, United States, affiliated with Antenna TV. It is owned by Mark Allen of M.C. Allen Productions. It picked up the America One affiliation from KGEC-LP in 2003.

History
KMCA-LD first signed on the air on October 14, 2003, as K56ID; originally operating as an America One affiliate. In 2015, the station switched its affiliation to Youtoo America.

On May 17, 2004, the station changed call letters to K02QA.

On March 28, 2020, the station changed call letters to KMCA-LP.

On November 29, 2010, the station turned off its analog signal and flash cut to digital on channel 10, and changed call letters to KMCA-LD.

On May 8, 2022, KMCA-LD switch its affiliation from Punch TV to Antenna TV.

Subchannel

For sale
The station's website mentions that KMCA and its sister stations are for sale.

External links
 KMCA Website (old)
 

Antenna TV affiliates
MCA-LD
Television channels and stations established in 2003
2003 establishments in California
Low-power television stations in the United States